Edward George Connors (January 1, 1933 – June 12, 1975), also known as "The Bulldog", was an American associate of the Winter Hill Gang and successful bar owner in Savin Hill.

Early life
Edward George Connors was born in Sharon, Massachusetts but raised in the Old Colony housing development at 265 East Ninth in South Boston, one of the Boston Housing Authority's oldest housing developments. His family suffered from financial problems and moved around frequently, they later moved to New Bedford, Massachusetts where they gave birth to his younger brother James Connors (December 24, 1936 – November 9, 2006). Like Edward, James pursued a career as a professional featherweight boxer like his brother Edward and later a career in the U.S. Air Force. Edward was a sparring partner of Anthony Veranis and Joe DeNucci. Edward had a close physical resemblance to heavyweight boxer Rocky Marciano. As a youth he was a regular at the L Street Curley Gym and Bathhouse located at 1663 Columbia Road in South Boston where Stephen Flemmi, James J. Bulger, Frank Salemme and William Bulger all hung out. In high school he was in the Old Colony Regional Vocational Technical High School basketball team in Rochester, Massachusetts as number "4" in 1955 and brought the team to the Massachusetts Interscholastic Athletic Association Northeastern Conference championships that year.

After graduating high school, he enlisted in the U.S. Marines. His brother James followed Edward into the military and joined the U.S. Air Force and became a fighter pilot stationed at McGuire Air Force Base. Edward was trained at Fort Devens, Massachusetts where he was later placed in the 1st Battalion 25th Marines. While in the U.S. Marines he started boxing and excelled at it. After his honorable discharge he took up professional boxing. During his professional boxing career, he received sponsorship by the boxing equipment and sportswear company Ben Lee, which would also sponsor his younger brother, James. As a professional boxer he worked with professional welterweight boxer and trainer Andy Escobar, Connors was his only client. He later opened up several barrooms in Revere and Dorchester, Massachusetts including "The Bulldog Tavern" in Savin Hill which began a hangout for known mob associates, loansharking and bookmaking. He is a close friend of Winter Hill Gang associate Alan Fidler. He was involved in bookmaking, loan sharking and drug trafficking with Alan Fidler. Edward was a close friend of future Massachusetts State Senator William R. Keating and Boston Mayor Ray Flynn who were introduced to each other for the first time at his saloon, The Bulldog. He was known as a vicious bar room brawler and worked as a bouncer and a bartender at The Bulldog which he used as his criminal headquarters for illegal gambling, drug dealing, loansharking and planned armed robberies with his associates.

Boxing career

Connors was a Middleweight boxer who fought with an orthodox stance. He was known for his agility and quickness to fight and earned a reputation as a "hard hitter". During his professional boxing career he weighed between 158 and 161 pounds. His first professional fight was against Billy Wilcox on August 3, 1954 in Boston, Massachusetts. On April 20, 1959 Connors was knocked out by Tony DeMarco in the sixth round and lost. His last professional boxing match was against Willie Green on December 21, 1960 in Providence, Rhode Island. On April 14, 1959 he boxed against future Massachusetts State Auditor Joe DeNucci and lost. On November 21, 1960 he fought against Willie Green for the New England Middleweight title championship and lost. During his overall professional boxing career he won twenty-two fights and had eighteen fights end in knock outs. He would later use his boxing training to handle drunk and disorderly customers in his Bulldog Tavern where he acted as a bartender and bouncer.
Both Edward Connors and Jimmy Connors were managed by Maury Fisher.

Spike O'Toole slaying

Winter Hill Gang associate James "Spike" O'Toole was a troubled alcoholic and a habitue of Connor's saloon, the Bulldog Tavern in Savin Hill. He tipped off his friend Howie Winter about O'Toole's drinking habits, and Winter told Connors to inform him the next time O'Toole was drinking at his saloon. O'Toole was later machine gunned by John Martorano as he walked out of his saloon on December 1, 1973.

Gangland slaying

After "Spike" O'Toole's gangland murder, Connors openly discussed his role in orchestrating the O'Toole murder with associates and patrons of his saloons in 1975. He also had been arrested in the commission of a botched armed robbery. During law enforcement's investigation into Connors his establishments were wire tapped, where they overheard enough information to bring Connors in for further questioning. Facing prison time and losing everything he had worked so hard for, Connors agreed to turn state evidence and testify against the Winter Hill gang with the promise of being put into a witness protection program and being able to retire with his family in Ireland. Needless to say with so many people on the Winter Hill payroll, word quickly spread up the ranks in law enforcement where Howie Winter soon learned that Connors was talking, and implicating the Winter Hill Gang in the O'Toole murder. Winter sent a message to Connors to give Winter the number for a "safe" telephone (one that was not tapped by the authorities), at which Winter could call Connors and discuss the matter. Connors was to appear at the station at 9:00 p.m. to receive the call from Howie Winter. Howie obtained the number and James J. Bulger, John Martorano and Stephen Flemmi tracked the number through contacts at Boston Edison to a pay telephone outside a gas station on William T. Morrissey Boulevard in Dorchester. Winter then arranged to call Connors at that telephone at a pre-determined time. One hundred yards away, 150 officers from the Boston Police Department were enjoying a banquet. All later reported to their superiors that they did not hear any of the gunfire. The only problem for the murder, was a Metropolitan District Commission police traffic detail was situated almost directly across the boulevard from the phone booth. 

James J. Bulger quickly found another phone booth and called in a false accident report to the MDC police. The traffic detail immediately left to answer the alarm, and moments later Connors pulled up in his Cadillac to await the call. On June 12, 1975, John Martorano drove to the gas station with James J. Bulger and Stephen Flemmi in a stolen sedan. The two men walked to the phone booth where Connors was talking to Howie Winter. Bulger and Flemmi, armed with a shotgun and automatic carbine rifle riddled the telephone booth with bullets, hitting Connors numerous times, almost cutting him in two. He died instantly.

Personal attack on William Bulger

By 1993, it became clear to the junior members of the Massachusetts State Senate that, in his fifteenth year as president, William Bulger had solidified his position. At this time, Bulger was trying to expand his political influence. When Mayor Ray Flynn quit City Hall to become ambassador to the Vatican, a special election was scheduled to replace him. Bulger quickly mobilized his troops behind Representative James T. Brett of Dorchester, the husband of his long-time secretary Patricia Brett. Brett made it to the runoff, but in the final couldn't overcome Thomas Menino, who as the president of the City Council had become acting mayor after Flynn's departure. But that Billy had been able to muscle his lightweight candidate into the final meant he wasn't quite dead yet.

Many younger Democratic politicians were growing concerned about the governorship gone and considered the U.S. senators less than attentive to state politics, the face of the Democratic Party had become William Bulger. It was generally construed that any Democrat who ran for governor was portrayed as a puppet for James J. Bulger and the organized crime element in the city. The Democrats would remain in control of the legislature, but the state senate presidency would remain out of reach for any hopeful candidates until William Bulger was forced to resign or was defeated by an opposition member. 

That task eventually fell to William R. Keating of Sharon, the same neighborhood that Edward was born and raised in. Senator Keating was not an unlikely candidate and competitor of William Bulger to run for the Senate presidency. William Bulger understood that any legislative leader who wished to survive must preserve at least an illusion of upward mobility for his members. If the rank-and-file legislator saw no future for himself in the status quo, Keating would more likely be willing to participate in any uprising against the leadership. 

Everyone knew that for Billy to survive in the senate, he would have to start easing out his more ambitious members, which including Bill Keating. Billy offered Keating a judgeship, which Keating turned down. Following the job refusal, one day in the spring of 1993, in the Senate chamber in front of the podium, he goaded Billy Bulger. He began talking about his old friend, Mayor Ray Flynn. Keating went on, in loud terms, what a great guy Flynn was. Finally Billy handed the gavel to one of his underlings and stalked off the rostrum, steaming. 

A few minutes later, a court officer told Keating that Billy wanted to see him. Bulger told Keating, "That Flynn is a not a good person, you know." Keating replied, "I have known Ray for a long time. I knew him since before I was even a state representative. You know where I first met him? I met him at this bar in Savin Hill. Maybe you heard of it - the Bulldog Tavern. Yeah, I'm in the Bulldog, and so's Ray, and this guy I know, he introduces us. You know who that guy was? It was Eddie Connors." 

Keating was talking about the same Edward G. Connors that Billy's brothers, James J. Bulger and Stephen Flemmi, had machine-gunned to death in a telephone booth on Morrissey Boulevard in 1975. Billy Bulger knew Connors very well; his saloon The Bulldog was located in his ward and a suspected victim of his brother, James. It was forbidden to mention James J. Bulger or his crimes in Billy's presence, and Keating had done it, in a backhanded way no less, with a smirk on his face. Keating spoke up, "Yeah, Mr. President. It was poor Eddie Connors who introduced me to Ray Flynn. You remember, Eddie Connors, Mr. President?".

References

External links
Eddie Connors Box Record
 https://web.archive.org/web/20080914124256/http://wrko.com/Whitey-Watch/975375

1933 births
1975 deaths
1975 murders in the United States
Drinking establishment owners
Gangsters from Boston
Welterweight boxers
Winter Hill Gang
People murdered in Massachusetts
Deaths by firearm in Massachusetts
Murdered American gangsters of Irish descent
American gangsters
American male boxers